Visakhapatnam, also known as Vizag, is a city and port in the South India state of Andhra Pradesh. Visakhapatnam has long history since 1068 AD inscriptions of Sri Bheemeswara Swamy temple, 4th largest city in south india.

Religion
Hinduism is the majority religion in this city with 93%, other religions are Islam, Christianity and Buddhism religious tolerance is very important in this city.

People

Majority of people in Visakhapatnam are Telugu because Visakhapatnam is the largest city in Andhra Pradesh. Along with that we can find Odia, Hindi, Tamil and Malayalam people also. Visakhapatnam has a cosmopolitan culture. English is also used widely in Vizag because significant amount of Anglo-Indian people lives here.

Cuisine
in Visakhapatnam  typical south Indian cuisine available its destination for Andhra food especially  Muri Mixture is famous along with idly, Dosa, Pesarattu, Kodi pulao and bamboo chicken and all so available of western food like pizza burgers.

Festivals
Makar Sankranti is famous festival in Vizag all so people celebrate  Ugadi, Vinayaka Chavithi, Deepavali, Dasara.

Sports
Cricket is the most popular game in Vizag. Kabaddi, tennis, badminton, and field hockey are also popular. Sports facilities include Dr. Y. S. Rajasekhara Reddy ACA–VDCA Cricket Stadium, Port Trust Diamond Jubilee Stadium, and Swarna Bharathi Indoor Stadium.

See also
 Telugu Samskruthika Niketanam, museum in Visakhapatnam

References

External links

 World Telugu Federation

Visakhapatnam
Visakhapatnam